Jesús Tartilán Requejo (born 2 August 1940) is a Spanish retired footballer who played as a midfielder, and a current coach.

Playing career
Born in Lugo, Galicia, Tartilán was a SD Ponferradina youth graduate, and made his senior debuts in 1960. In the following year, he moved to Real Betis in La Liga, but failed to appear in any official matches for the club, being also loaned to Cultural y Deportiva Leonesa in 1962.

In 1963, Tartilán moved to Segunda División with Cádiz CF. He made his professional debut on 23 February 1964, starting in a 1–2 away loss against CA Ceuta; it was his maiden appearance for the club.

In the 1964, summer Tartilán joined RCD Espanyol, and made his top level debut on 7 February 1965, playing the full 90 minutes in a 4–2 home win against Real Zaragoza. He left the Pericos in June, and subsequently represented CE L'Hospitalet, Ponferradina, UD Melilla and Cleveland Stokers, retiring with the latter in 1969.

Post-playing career
Tartilán started his managerial career at UD Cacabelense in 1978, and was also at the helm of Cultural Leonesa in the following year. With the latter, he remained three seasons in Segunda División B, until being sacked in 1982.

Tartilán was subsequently manager of SD Ponferradina in seven occasions, only split by a spell at CD Numancia in 1991.

References

External links
 
 
 Cadistas 1910 profile  
 Aúpa Deportiva profile 
 Periquito profile 

1940 births
Living people
Spanish footballers
Footballers from Lugo
Association football midfielders
La Liga players
Segunda División players
Tercera División players
SD Ponferradina players
Real Betis players
Cultural Leonesa footballers
Cádiz CF players
RCD Espanyol footballers
CE L'Hospitalet players
UD Melilla footballers
Cleveland Stokers players
Spanish expatriate footballers
Spanish expatriate sportspeople in the United States
Expatriate soccer players in the United States
Spanish football managers
Cultural Leonesa managers
SD Ponferradina managers
Racing de Ferrol managers
CD Numancia managers